Charles William Mayo (July 28, 1898 – July 28, 1968) was an American surgeon and a member of the board of governors of the Mayo Clinic beginning in 1933. He was the son of Mayo Clinic co-founder Charles Horace Mayo and Edith (Graham) Mayo.

Life
In addition to his skill as a surgeon, he was also known as a medical administrator whose work was key in the development of group medical practice. He chaired the Mayo Foundation, and the board of regents at the University of Minnesota. He also had a role in the United Nations, appointed by President Dwight D. Eisenhower, and was elected president of the American Association for the United Nations in February 1954.

Born in Rochester, Minnesota, Mayo graduated from Princeton University in 1921. He then received his medical degree from University of Pennsylvania in 1926 and his master's degree in surgery from University of Minnesota in 1931. He (and his son) trained at Robert Packer Hospital in Sayre, Pennsylvania. Mayo taught at University of Minnesota and was a professor of surgery. During World War II, Mayo served in the United States Army Medical Corps with the rank of colonel.

He and his wife Alice had six children. He died in a motor vehicle accident on his 70th birthday, near Rochester, Minnesota.

Selected works 
 Mayo, Charles William. Surgery of the Small & Large Intestine, Year Book Medical Publishers, 1962.
 Mayo, Charles William. Mayo: the Story of My Family and My Career, Doubleday, 1968.

References

Further reading
 Encyclopædia Britannica. Online edition. Retrieved on 2009-02-18.
 Encyclopedia Americana. p. 550. Grolier, 1993.
 Statement by the President on the death of Charles W. Mayo. John T. Woolley and Gerhard Peters, The American Presidency Project [online]. Santa Barbara, CA: University of California (hosted), Gerhard Peters (database). Retrieved on 2009-02-18.
 Eckman, J. and J. Berkson (December 1968). "Charles William Mayo, M.D., 1898–1968: as we remember him." J Lancet. 88 (12):319–21.

1898 births
1968 deaths
People from Rochester, Minnesota
Military personnel from Minnesota
United States Army personnel of World War II
Princeton University alumni
The Hill School alumni
Perelman School of Medicine at the University of Pennsylvania alumni
University of Minnesota Medical School alumni
University of Minnesota faculty
Physicians from Minnesota
Writers from Minnesota
American surgeons
Mayo Clinic people
Road incident deaths in Minnesota
20th-century surgeons
United States Army Medical Corps officers
United States Army colonels